Dortmund-Aplerbeck Süd station is a railway station in the southern part of the Aplerbeck district in the town of Dortmund, located in North Rhine-Westphalia, Germany.

Rail services

References

Railway stations in Dortmund